Charles Fremont Amidon (August 17, 1856 – December 26, 1937), frequently known as C. F. Amidon, was a United States district judge of the United States District Court for the District of North Dakota.

Education and career

Born in Clymer, New York, Amidon received an Artium Baccalaureus degree from Hamilton College in 1882 and read law to enter the bar in 1886. He was in private practice in Fargo, Dakota Territory (State of North Dakota from November 2, 1889) from 1887 to 1890, and was city attorney of Fargo from 1890 to 1894, returning to private practice from 1894 to 1896. He was a Code Commissioner for the Commission to Revise Codes of North Dakota from 1893 to 1895.

Federal judicial service
Amidon received a recess appointment from President Grover Cleveland on August 31, 1896, to a seat on the United States District Court for the District of North Dakota vacated by Judge Alfred Delavan Thomas. He was nominated to the same position by President Cleveland on December 8, 1896. He was confirmed by the United States Senate on February 18, 1897, and received his commission the same day. He assumed senior status on June 2, 1928. His service terminated on December 26, 1937, due to his death in Tucson, Arizona. He was the last federal judge in active service to have been appointed by President Cleveland, and the longest-serving.

References

Sources
 

1856 births
1937 deaths
Judges of the United States District Court for the District of North Dakota
United States federal judges appointed by Grover Cleveland
19th-century American judges
United States federal judges admitted to the practice of law by reading law